The Haines Highway or Haines Cut-Off (and still often called Haines Road) is a highway that connects Haines, Alaska, in the United States, with Haines Junction, Yukon, Canada, passing through the province of British Columbia.

The highway was known as Yukon Highway 4 until 1978, when it was renumbered Highway 3. It has no number in British Columbia, but editions of The Milepost up to at least 2004 list it as Hwy 4, a number actually in use on Vancouver Island. The Alaska section is part of Alaska Route 7.

History
The route was originally a trail used by Chilkat Tlingit traders, which eventually became the Dalton Trail. It was used by some prospectors during the Klondike Gold Rush of 1898-1899; other mining kept the lower Dalton Trail active through the years following its establishment. The British Columbia provincial government converted its portion of the trail to a wagon road in 1909 when copper mining began at Copper Butte and Mt. Glave. In 1911, 30 tons of ore were shipped from the mines.

The highway was built by the U.S. Army in 1943 as an alternate route from the Pacific Ocean to the Alaska Highway, in case the White Pass and Yukon Route railway from Skagway should be blocked. The total cost of the construction was US$13 million.

In the first decades after the war, maintenance was spotty at best; the road was plagued with blizzards in winter and mudslides in summer, and for a time in the 1960s and 1970s, all vehicles traveling the highway were monitored on radio. Year-round access was not achieved until 1963.

Complaints over the condition of the road, primarily in Alaska, led to the U.S. Congress-funded Shakwak reconstruction project. This project, covering the Haines Highway and the portion of the Alaska Highway from Haines Junction to the U.S. border, began in 1976 and was mostly complete by the 1980s, but is still continuing, providing grade improvements, rerouting of dangerous sections, and paving. Responsibility for maintenance is currently shared between the Alaska and Yukon governments.

Major intersections

See also
Dalton Trail
Glacier Camp
List of Alaska Routes
List of Yukon territorial highways

References

External links

 Road History - Sheldon Museum and Cultural Center

Transportation in Haines Borough, Alaska
State highways in Alaska
Yukon territorial highways
Atlin District